Alexander Peddie FRSE FRCPE LLD (3 June 1810 – 19 January 1907) was a Scottish physician and author. He was president of the Royal College of Physicians of Edinburgh from 1877 until 1879, and was co-founder of Royal Hospital for Sick Children, Edinburgh.

Life 

He was the son of James Peddie, born in Edinburgh. He attended the school of William Lennie and Edinburgh High School. After four years as a bank clerk, he became an apprentice to James Syme. He obtained an M.D. degree from University of Edinburgh in 1835.

Peddie died at his home at 15 Rutland Street, in the West End of Edinburgh, on 19 January 1907. He is buried with his parents in Warriston Cemetery in northern Edinburgh. His monument is a small granite stone behind the large Peddie monument (on its north side). His nephew, the architect John Dick Peddie, lies adjacent.

References

External links

Fellows of the Royal College of Physicians of Edinburgh
19th-century Scottish medical doctors
Fellows of the Royal Society of Edinburgh
Medical doctors from Edinburgh
People educated at the Royal High School, Edinburgh
Alumni of the University of Edinburgh
Scottish surgeons
1810 births
1907 deaths